The Weihenstephan-Triesdorf University of Applied Science is a Fachhochschule in Freising, Germany.

Facts and figures

Students (winter semester 2016/17) 

 6,400 students (4,200 in Weihenstephan | 2,200 in Triesdorf)
 1,780 new students (1,180 in Weihenstephan | 600 in Triesdorf)
 6,500 online applications

Staff (winter semester 2016/17) 

 146 professors
 323 part-time lecturers (incl. special lecturers)
 110 research assistants and special lecturers (full-time)
 403 staff

Degree programmes 

 19 bachelor's degree programmes
 13 work-study degree programmes
 12 master's degree programmes, including:
 4 international master's programmes

Departments 

 Biotechnology and Bioinformatics
 Horticulture and Food Technology
 Landscape Architecture
 Agriculture and Food Economy
 Agriculture
 Environmental Engineering
 Forestry

Research 

 5 projects supported by the EU
 50 projects supported by the federal government and the state of Bavaria
 66 projects supported by external sponsors

International matters 

 80 university partnerships
 350 international students
 German-French double degree with our partner university, Agrocampus Ouest-Centre d'Angers Weihenstephan-Triesdorf University of Applied Sciences was one of 12 German universities of applied sciences to be awarded the European seal of quality - E-Quality 2011.

Points of interest
 the Sichtungsgarten Weihenstephan, a notable horticultural garden

Notable alumni
Tessa Ganserer, German politician

References

External links
 http://www.hswt.de

Universities and colleges in Bavaria
Educational institutions established in 1971
Universities of Applied Sciences in Germany
Freising (district)
Agricultural universities and colleges in Germany
Buildings and structures in Freising (district)